A tax is a mandatory financial charge or some other type of levy imposed upon a taxpayer (an individual or other legal entity) by a governmental organization in order to fund various public expenditures.

Tax or TAX may also refer to:

 Meredith Tax (1942–2022), American writer and political activist
 Thai AirAsia X (TAX), an airline based in Thailand
 The Adams Express (TAX), a publicly traded diversified equity fund
 Taxol, a chemotherapy medication
 Tax Crossroads, Georgia, a community in the United States

See also 
 Taxiing, the movement of an aircraft on the ground